{{DISPLAYTITLE:C3H8N2}}
The molecular formula C3H8N2 (molar mass: 72.11 g/mol, exact mass: 72.0688 u) may refer to:

 Imidazolidine
 Pyrazolidine